Ussana is a comune (municipality) in the Province of South Sardinia in the Italian region Sardinia, located about  north of Cagliari.

Ussana borders the following municipalities: Donorì, Monastir, Nuraminis, Samatzai, Serdiana.

Demographic evolution

References

Cities and towns in Sardinia